Lanark and Hamilton East is a county constituency of the House of Commons of the Parliament of the United Kingdom, which was first used at the 2005 general election. It covers parts of the former Clydesdale, Hamilton North and Bellshill and Hamilton South constituencies, and it elects one Member of Parliament (MP) by the first past the post voting system.

Historically a safe Labour seat, in 2015 it was  gained by the Scottish National Party when they won a record 56 of the 59 Scottish seats at Westminster; ending 51 years of Labour Party dominance at UK general elections in Scotland. Two years later at the 2017 general election, the Conservatives surged into second place; only 266 votes behind sitting MP Angela Crawley - followed by Labour in third place at just 96 votes behind the Conservative candidate, making the seat Britain's tightest three-way marginal. The result also made it the tightest three-way marginal since 1945.

Constituency profile
The seat covers most of Hamilton and the rural area around Lanark. Electoral Calculus describes the seat as "Traditional", characterised by working class people with lower levels of income and formal education.

Boundaries

As created by the Fifth Review of the Boundary Commission for Scotland the constituency is one of six covering the Dumfries and Galloway council area, the Scottish Borders council area and the South Lanarkshire council area. The other five constituencies are: Berwickshire, Roxburgh and Selkirk, Dumfries and Galloway, Dumfriesshire, Clydesdale and Tweeddale, East Kilbride, Strathaven and Lesmahagow, and Rutherglen and Hamilton West.

The constituency is created with the electoral wards of:

In full: Bothwell and Uddingston, Clydesdale North, Clydesdale West, Larkhall.
In part: Clydesdale East, Clydesdale South, Hamilton North and East, Hamilton South, Hamilton West and Earnock.

Members of Parliament

Election results

Elections in the 2010s

Elections in the 2000s

References 

Westminster Parliamentary constituencies in Scotland
Constituencies of the Parliament of the United Kingdom established in 2005
Politics of South Lanarkshire
Bothwell and Uddingston
Hamilton, South Lanarkshire
Lanark
Larkhall